"Mind at the End of the Tether" is a single by the industrial hip-hop group Tackhead, released in 1986 on On-U Sound Records. Although the record states otherwise, the B-side is actually the Fats Comet song "King of the Beat".

Formats and track listing 
All songs written by Keith LeBlanc, Skip McDonald, Adrian Sherwood and Doug Wimbish
UK 12" single (ON-U DP 15)
"Mind at the End of the Tether" – 6:40
"King of the Beat" – 7:46

Personnel 

Tackhead
Keith LeBlanc – drums, percussion
Skip McDonald – guitar
Adrian Sherwood – sampler, programming, producer
Doug Wimbish – bass guitar

Additional musicians
DJ Cheese – scratches (B-side)

Charts

References

External links 
 

1986 songs
1986 singles
On-U Sound Records singles
Song recordings produced by Adrian Sherwood
Tackhead songs
Songs written by Doug Wimbish